Sundanese cuisine is the cuisine of the Sundanese people of Western Java, and Banten, Indonesia. It is one of the most popular foods in Indonesia. Sundanese food is characterised by its freshness; the famous lalab eaten with sambal and also karedok demonstrate the Sundanese fondness for fresh raw vegetables. Unlike the rich and spicy taste, infused with coconut milk and curry of Minangkabau cuisine, the Sundanese cuisine displays the simple and clear taste; ranged from savoury salty, fresh sourness, mild sweetness, to hot and spicy.

Sambal terasi is the most important and the most common condiment in Sundanese cuisine, and eaten together with lalab or fried tofu and tempeh. Sayur Asem vegetable tamarind soup is probably the most popular vegetable soup dish in Sundanese cuisine. Another popular soup is Soto Bandung, a soup of beef and daikon radish, and mie kocok noodle soup with beef meat and kikil.

Ingredients

Fresh water fishes such as carp, gourami, tilapia and catfish are usually either being bakar (grilled) or goreng (deep fried) and usually served with sambal or sweet soy sauce. Sundanese people has developed fondness for salted seafoods. Various fried salted fishes, anchovy, and salted cuttlefish is popular in Sundanese daily diet. The pais or pepes cooking method that employs banana leaf as the wrapper of food is also common in Sundanese cuisine. Among other, pais lauk emas or carp fish pepes is among the favourite pepes dishes.

Chicken are usually either fried or grilled, also served with sambal or sweet soy sauce. Bakakak hayam is Sundanese style ayam bakar (grilled chicken). Sometimes chicken also can be made as pepes or soup. Meats such as beef, water buffalo, lamb, mutton, or goat can be marinated with the mixture of spices and coconut sugar and fried to make the empal gepuk sweet fried meat, sprinkled with fried shallots. Beef and potato sometimes are stewed in sweet soy sauce and spices as semur daging. Cow liver and jengkol stinky bean also can be made as semur as well. Goat, mutton, and lamb meat also can be made as satay in Sundanese style, such as sate maranggi. Gulai kambing (lamb curry), and empal gentong goat meat and offal curry is also popular soup.

If Javanese has developed their fondness for tempeh, Sundanese has developed the fondness for oncom instead, both are fermented products but with different kind of fungi and beans; tempeh is from soy beans while oncom is from peanuts. Sundanese has developed the fermentation method to create distinct foodstuffs. Fermentation was employed either for making fermented food such as oncom, making sauce such as tauco (adopted from Chinese Indonesian cuisine), or sweet snack foods such as peuyeum which are tapai made from rice or cassava.

Sundanese restaurant

In Sundanese cuisine establishments, it is common to eat with one's hands. They usually serve kobokan, a bowl of tap water with a slice of lime in it to give a fresh scent. This bowl of water with lime in it should not to be consumed, however; it is used to wash one's hand before and after eating.

Sundanese traditional restaurant may feature a traditional dine style called lesehan; having a dine while seating on the floor covered with straw or bamboo mat. The dishes may be served on a short legged table or altogether served on the mat. This dine style is quite similar with Japanese traditional tatami dine style. The Sundanese traditional restaurant in rural village may also feature a saung style restaurant. It features several small eating pavilions that might be built near or over fresh water fish ponds. The fish ponds contains alive fresh water fishes such as carp and gourami, that might be selected and ordered by customers to be freshly cooked immediately.

In popular Indonesian culture, Sundanese restaurant often can be easily distinguished by containing the name "Kuring", thus led to the terms "Kuring"-food or "Kuring"-restaurant. However this naming was rather misleading, since in Sundanese language the word Kuring is a common, colloquial, yet rather coarse form to refer first-person singular personal pronoun ("I" or "me"), also as possessive adjective ("my"). This naming trend was led by restaurants that tried to imitate the famous Sundanese restaurant Lembur Kuring (Sundanese: "My Home Village"). Some examples of famous Sundanese restaurants are Ampera, Boboko, Bumbu Desa, Ciganea, Dapur Sunda, Laksana, Lembur Kuring, Mang Engking, Mang Kabayan, Ma' Uneh, Ponyo, Sari Kuring, Saung Kuring, Sindang Reret and Talaga Sampireun.

Dishes

 Nasi timbel, referring to the style of wrapping a cooked hot steamed rice in banana leaf. The heat of hot-cooked rice touches the banana leaf and produced a unique aroma. It is made in ways similar to making lontong; compressed, rolled, and wrapped in banana leaves; it then evolves into a complete dish served with various side-dishes like fried chicken, duck or pigeon, empal gepuk, jambal roti, tahu, tempeh, sayur asem, with lalab and sambal. Nasi timbel later evolved to nasi bakar.
 Nasi liwet Sunda, one pot cooking consisting of rice and seasoned with spices like galangal, lemon grass, and Indonesian bay leaves. To further enhance the flavour, usually parts of salted fish are thrown in as well.
 Nasi tutug oncom, hot steamed rice mixed with roasted oncom, shallots, and kencur, usually served with krupuk, sambal terasi, and anchovy.

 Lalab, raw vegetables salad usually eaten with sambal  
 Sambal terasi, mortar ground chillies with shrimp paste   
 Karedok, raw vegetable salad in peanut sauce
 Lotek, boiled vegetable salad in peanut sauce

 Sayur Asem, sour tamarind vegetable soup.
 Oncom, a type of fermented food similar to tempeh. Oncom can be fried, made pepes or stir fried with vegetables such as Ulukutek Leunca (Solanum nigrum) or Oncom Peuteuy (green stink bean).
 Tumis Tauco, vegetables stir fried with fermented soybean paste sauce. Tauco is similar to Japanese miso paste.
 Tumis Kangkung, stir fried of water spinach
 Various Pepes, pepes is cooking method employing banana leaf wrapper, various ingredients could be made into pepes, such as carp, anchovy, tofu, oncom, leunca, mushroom, salted egg, etc. The famous recipe is Pais Lauk Emas (carp fish pepes).
 Various Ikan bakar, literary means "grilled fish", served with sweet soy sauce and chilli dipping sauce. The fish could be carp, gourami, tilapia, or catfish.

 Various Ikan goreng, literary means "fried fish", served with sweet soy sauce and chilli dipping sauce. The fish could be carp, gourami, tilapia, or catfish. The famous recipe is Gurame goreng kipas, which is deep fried gourami with flesh spread like a fan.
 Various Ikan Asin, salted fishes, mostly seafood fishes such as peda, jambal, pari (rays), ikan asin bulu ayam, teri (anchovy), and cumi asin (cuttlefish); also fresh water gabus (snakehead).
 Bakakak hayam, Sundanese style grilled chicken
 Soto Bandung, a type of soto, beef and daikon soup
 Soto mie, a type of soto with rice vermicelli, spring roll and beef tendon
 Mie kocok, a type of noodle dish with beef meat and kikil
 Sate Maranggi, a Sundanese style marinated satay usually using goat meat
 Gulai Kambing, goat or mutton meat and offal curry
 Empal gentong, a type of goat or mutton meat and offal curry from Cirebon
 Empal gepuk, sweet and spicy fried beef
 Laksa Bogor, a variant of laksa from Bogor
 Kupat tahu, ketupat, tofu, rice vermicelli and beansprouts in peanut sauce
 Asinan, type of vinegar fermented vegetables or fruit dish.
 Baso Tahu, Indonesian style dimsum with peanut sauce, also known as Siomay Bandung.
 Batagor, Baso Tahu Goreng, or fried bakso and tofu.
 Seblak, stir fried wet krupuk with other ingredients.

Snacks

 Surabi, traditional rice flour pancake in sweet coconut sugar syrup or topped with spicy oncom mixture
 Tahu Sumedang, fried tofu snack
 Tahu gejrot, slightly fermented fried tofu snack with slices of shallots, chilli, and garlic in spicy-sweet sauce
 Bala-bala, fried dough snack made from various chopped vegetables
 Cireng, fried dough snack made from sago or cassava flour. Aci goreng (Sundanese: "fried sago flour")
 Cilok, flavoured sago balls skewered. Aci dicolok (Sundanese: "poked sago balls")
 Cimol, sago balls snack
 Colenak, roasted cassava with sweet coconut dipping sauce. Dicocol enak (Sundanese: "delicious dip")
 Leupeut, compacted rice with or without filling, wrapped in young coconut leaf
 Peuyeum sampeu, sweet fermented cassava
 Peuyeum ketan, sweet fermented sticky rice wrapped in guava leaf
 Comro, fried dough made of finely shredded cassava with spicy oncom filling. Oncom dijero (Sundanese: "oncom inside")
 Misro, same fried dough as comro but instead filled with melted palm sugar. Amis dijero (Sundanese: "sweet inside")
 Odading, fried sweet bread, some variation filled with banana
 Dodol Garut, sweets made from sticky rice powder and palm sugar, with added milk, or sesame seed.
 Kolontong, roasted cylindrical shaped rice crackers with either cane sugar or palm sugar coating.
 Opak, roasted disc shaped rice crackers.
 Ranginang, fried rice grain crackers seasoned with terasi.
 Kalua, dried fruit marinated in sugar.
 Ladu, sweets made from part of fine sticky rice powder and part coarse roasted sticky rice grains, mixed with palm sugar then compacted; usually has triangular cut.

Drinks

 Bajigur, traditional hot drink made from coconut milk, spices, pandan leaf, and coconut sugar
 Bandrek, traditional hot drink made from ginger, spices, and coconut sugar
 Cendol, traditional cold drink made from coconut sugar, coconut milk, and green glutinous rice jelly
 Es Doger, ice cream-like dessert made from coconut flesh, coconut milk, peuyeum (sweet fermented cassava) and pink syrup (rose or cocopandan)
 Es Goyobod, the Sundanese version of es campur; mixed jelly and mashed avocado drink in heavy coconut milk and jackfruit-infused brown sugar syrup.
 Es Duren, ice cream-like dessert made from durian and milk
 Lahang is a traditional sweet and cold beverages made from the sap of Arenga pinnata (aren).

See also

 Indonesian cuisine
 Javanese cuisine
 Malay cuisine
 Minangkabau cuisine
 Balinese cuisine

References

External links

 
 
Indonesian cuisine-related lists